The .300 Weatherby Magnum is a .30 caliber rifle cartridge created by Roy Weatherby in 1944 and produced by Weatherby. It has become the most popular of all the Weatherby cartridges.

Background
Roy Weatherby already had experience with other custom cartridges such as his own .270 Weatherby Magnum when he created the .300 Weatherby. Like most of his other magnum cartridges, this is based on a blown-out .300 H&H Magnum case, using the signature Weatherby double-radius shoulder. The Weatherby was first introduced in 1944, and the .300 Winchester Magnum was introduced in 1963.

In recent years, Remington, Winchester and Ruger have produced rifles in this caliber, and most major ammunition manufacturers now supply factory loads.

Performance
Historically, Weatherby claimed that this is the most powerful .30 caliber magnum rifle commercially available, but the recently introduced .300 Remington Ultra Magnum, the .300 Norma Magnum and Weatherby's own .30-378 Weatherby Magnum are now more powerful. Of course there are quite a few very large .30 caliber wildcat cartridges.

When comparing the .300 RUM and the .300 Weatherby Magnum, however, there is a difference in factory loadings.  Performance data is often listed on the side of the ammunition box for those who wish to do an in-store comparison.  On average, Weatherby factory ammo is loaded to higher chamber pressures than Remington or Winchester magnum rounds. The Remington round can be handloaded to equal pressures, and as a consequence, surpass the .300 Weatherby in power.

The .300 Weatherby is commonly used by big-game hunters all over the world.

See also
 List of rifle cartridges
 7 mm caliber other cartridges in the same caliber range
 Table of handgun and rifle cartridges

References

 .300 Weatherby Magnum at Accurate Powder Cartridge dimensions.

Pistol and rifle cartridges
Magnum rifle cartridges
Weatherby Magnum rifle cartridges